The Japanese beetle (Popillia japonica) is a species of scarab beetle. It is not very destructive in Japan (where it is controlled by natural predators), but in North America and some regions of Europe is a noted pest to roughly 300 species of plants, including rose bushes, grapes, hops, canna, crape myrtles, birch trees, linden trees, and others.

The adult beetles damage plants by skeletonizing the foliage (i.e., consuming only the material between a leaf's veins) as well as, at times, feeding on a plant's fruit. The subterranean larvae feed on the roots of grasses.

Description 
A row of white tufts (spots) of hair project from under the wing covers on each side of the body. Males are slightly smaller than females. Grubs are white and lie in curled positions.

Distribution 
Popillia japonica is native to Japan, but is an invasive species in North America and Europe.

The first written evidence of the insect appearing within the United States was in 1916 in a nursery near Riverton, New Jersey. The beetle larvae are thought to have entered the United States in a shipment of iris bulbs prior to 1912, when inspections of commodities entering the country began. As of 2015, just nine western states of the United States were considered free of Japanese beetles. Beetles have been detected in airports on the west coast of the United States since the 1940s.

The first Japanese beetle found in Canada was inadvertently brought by tourists to Yarmouth, Nova Scotia by ferry from Maine in 1939. During the same year, three additional adults were captured at Yarmouth and three at Lacolle in southern Quebec.

Japanese beetles have been found in the islands of the Azores since the 1970s. In 2014, the first population in mainland Europe was discovered near Milan in Italy. In 2017, the pest was detected in Switzerland, most likely having spread over the border from Italy. Swiss authorities are attempting to eradicate the pest.

Only three were found in Washington State, USA in 2020, but then from late June to September 3, 2021 there were over 20,000 found in Grandview alone.

Lifecycle 

Ova are laid individually, or in small clusters near the soil surface. Within approximately two weeks, the ova hatch, the larvae feeding on fine roots and other organic material. As the larvae mature, they become c-shaped grubs which consume progressively coarser roots and may do economic damage to pasture and turf at this time.

Larvae hibernate in small cells in the soil, emerging in the spring when soil temperatures rise again. Within 4–6 weeks of breaking hibernation, the larvae will pupate. Most of the beetle's life is spent as a larva, with only 30–45 days spent as an imago. Adults feed on leaf material above ground, using pheromones to attract other beetles and overwhelm plants, skeletonizing leaves from the top of the plant downward. The aggregation of beetles will alternate daily between mating, feeding, and ovipositing. An adult female may lay as many as 40–60 ova in her lifetime.

Throughout the majority of the Japanese beetle's range, its lifecycle takes one full year, however in the extreme northern parts of its range, as well as high altitude zones as found in its native Japan, development may take two years.

Control 

Phenological models might be useful in predicting the timing of presence of larvae or adults of the Japanese beetle. Model outputs can be used to support the timely implementation of monitoring and control actions against the pest, thus reducing its potential impact.

Owing to its destructive nature, traps have been invented specifically to target Japanese beetles. These comprise a pair of crossed walls with a bag or plastic container underneath and are baited with floral scent, pheromone, or both. However, studies conducted at the University of Kentucky and Eastern Illinois University suggest beetles attracted to traps frequently do not end up in the traps, instead, they land on plants in the vicinity and cause more damage along the flight path and near the trap than may have occurred if the trap were not present.

During the larval stage, the Japanese beetle lives in lawns and other grasslands, where it eats the roots of grasses. During that stage, it is susceptible to a fatal disease called milky spore disease, caused by a bacterium called milky spore, Paenibacillus (formerly Bacillus) popilliae. The USDA developed this biological control and it is commercially available in powder form for application to lawn areas. Standard applications (low density across a broad area) take from two to four years to establish maximal protection against larval survival, expanding through the soil through repeated rounds of infection. Control programs based on milky spore disease have been found to work most efficiently when applied as large-scale treatment programs, rather than by isolated landowners. Bacillus thuringiensis is also used to control Japanese beetle populations in the same manner.

On field crops such as squash, floating row covers can be used to exclude the beetles, but this may necessitate hand pollination of flowers. Kaolin sprays can also be used as barriers.

Research performed by many US extension service branches has shown that pheromone traps attract more beetles than they catch; under favorable conditions, only up to three quarters of the insects attracted to a trap will be captured by it. Traps are most effective when spread out over an entire community, and downwind and at the borders (i.e., as far away as possible, particularly upwind), of managed property containing plants being protected. 

When present in small numbers, the beetles may be manually controlled using a soap-water spray mixture, shaking a plant in the morning hours and disposing of the fallen beetles, or simply picking them off attractions such as rose flowers, since the presence of beetles attracts more beetles to that plant.

Several insect predators and parasitoids have been introduced to the United States for biocontrol. Two of them, the fly Istocheta aldrichi, a parasite of adult beetles, and the solitary wasp Tiphia vernalis, a parasite of larvae, are well established with significant but variable rates of parasitism. Tiphia vernalis reproduces by locating beetle grubs through digging, and on finding one paralyzes it with a sting and lays an egg on it; on hatching, the wasp larva consumes the grub. Istocheta aldrichi instead seeks out adult female beetles and lays eggs on the their thoraxes, allowing its larvae to burrow into the insect's body and kill it in this manner. A female I. aldrichi can lay up to 100 eggs over two weeks, and the rapidity with which its larvae kill their hosts allows use of these flies to suppress beetle populations before they can themselve reproduce.

Soil-dwelling nematodes are known to seek out and prey on Japanese beetle grubs during the subterranean portion of their life cycle by entering larvae and reproducing within their bodies. Varieties that have seen commercial use as pest control agents include Steinernema glaseri and Heterorhabditis bacteriophora.

Host plants 
While the larvae of Japanese beetles feed on the roots of many genera of grasses, the adults consume the leaves of a much wider range of hosts, including these common crops: bean, cannabis, strawberry, tomato, pepper, grape, hop, rose, cherry, plum, pear, peach, raspberry, blackberry, corn, pea, okra, and blueberry.

List of adult beetle hostplant genera 

 Abelmoschus (okra, musk mallow) 
 Acer (maple)
 Aesculus (horse chestnut)
 Alcea (hollyhock) 
 Aronia
 Asimina (pawpaw) Asparagus Aster Buddleja (butterfly bush)
 Calluna Caladium Canna Cannabis sativa Chaenomeles Castanea (sweet chestnut)
 Cirsium (thistle)
 Cosmos
 Dahlia
 Daucus (carrot)
 Dendranthema
 Digitalis (foxglove) 
 Dolichos
 Echinacea (coneflower)
 Hemerocallis (daylily) 
 Heuchera
 Hibiscus
 Humulus (hop)
 Hydrangea
 Ilex (holly)
 Impatiens
 Ipomoea (morning glory)
 Iris
 Juglans (walnut)
 Lagerstroemia
 Liatris
 Ligustrum (privet)
 Malus (apple, crabapple)
 Malva (mallow)
 Mentha (mint)
 Myrica
 Ocimum (basil)
 Oenothera (evening primrose) Parthenocissus Phaseolus Phlox Physocarpus Pistacia Platanus (plane)
 Polygonum (Japanese knotweed)
 Populus (poplar)
 Prunus (plum, peach, etc.)
 Quercus (oak)
 Ribes (gooseberry, currants, etc.)
 Rheum (rhubarb) 
 Rhododendron Rosa (rose)
 Rubus (raspberry, blackberry, etc.)
 Salix (willows)
 Sambucus (elder)
 Sassafras Solanum (nightshades, including potato, tomato, eggplant)
 Spinacia (spinach)
 Syringa (lilac)
 Thuja (arborvitae)
 Tilia (basswood, linden, UK: lime)
 Toxicodendron (poison oak, poison ivy, sumac)
 Ulmus (elm)
 Vaccinium (blueberry)
 Viburnum Vitis (grape)
 Weigelia Wisteria Zea (maize)
 Zinnia''

Gallery

References

External links 

 Japanese beetle on the UF/IFAS Featured Creatures Web site
 Japanese Beetle, Canadian Food Inspection Agency
 Organic methods of Japanese Beetle Control
 Species Profile – Japanese Beetle (Popillia japonica), National Invasive Species Information Center, United States National Agricultural Library.

Beetles described in 1841
Beetles of Asia
Grape pest insects
Insect pests of ornamental plants
Taxa named by Edward Newman
Insects in culture
Rutelinae